Helen Crump is a fictional dramatic character on the American television program The Andy Griffith Show (1960–1968). Helen made her debut in the third-season episode "Andy Discovers America" (1963). Helen was a schoolteacher and became main character Sheriff Andy Taylor's girlfriend. She also appeared in spinoff program Mayberry R.F.D. (1968–1971), as well as the reunion telemovie, Return to Mayberry (1986). Helen was portrayed by Aneta Corsaut.

Character biography 
Helen Crump is from Kansas. She attended college in Kansas City where she majored in journalism. Helen takes up residence in Mayberry and is employed as an elementary schoolteacher. Her uncle, Edward, and her young niece, Cynthia, visit her in Mayberry. Unlike other Mayberry women, Helen has no special skills in the kitchen. She enjoys picnicking, and in one episode, directs the high school's senior play. An independent, self-sufficient, professional single woman, Helen is a wise and thoughtful character who serves on most occasions as the voice of reason on the show. However, at times she can be abrupt, displaying a quick temper and showing flashes of temperamentality, jumping to conclusions without thinking things through.

Helen is first introduced in the third-season episode "Andy Discovers America" (1963). Opie and his classmates take a dislike to their new teacher, referring to her as "old lady Crump". The boys complain about her history assignments. Andy gives Opie some advice about his own experience with school which Opie misconstrues into thinking he doesn't have to do his history schoolwork. Helen appears at the courthouse and acting on her assumptions based on Opie's misinterpretation of his father's advice, proceeds to give Andy a piece of her mind on his interference in her domain. Andy is dumbfounded but finds a way to get the boys excited about their history assignments. Helen is astonished but pleased with the change in Opie and his pals. When she learns Andy played a part in the turnabout, she thanks him and the two become friends.  At the end of the episode, Andy shows his attraction to Helen by offering to walk her home and attempting to rid himself of Barney Fife who wants to discuss history with Helen.

Relationship with Andy Taylor 

Andy and Helen have many pleasant social outings: they attend dances, picnic at Myers Lake, and double date with others (usually Barney Fife and Thelma Lou). Their relationship however, is not one of complete sweetness and light. The two have frequent disagreements, sudden jealousies (particularly on Helen's part, most often needlessly so), misunderstandings (also mainly on Helen's part) and lover's quarrels. For example, in "Guest in the House", Helen becomes needlessly jealous and starts an argument with Andy when a female friend of the Taylor family comes to stay at Andy's house after an argument with her fiancé. In "Helen, the Authoress", Helen has written a book and uses her evenings to rewrite the manuscript before its publication by a Richmond firm. When she cancels a dinner date with Andy to work on her book, Andy becomes impatient and tells her that he doesn't have to sit home alone. Helen is indignant, of course, and brushes him off. Andy then calls Mavis Neff (a woman reputed to be "rather forward"), and arranges a date with her. When Mavis gets too close, Andy realizes his mistake and apologizes to Helen. In the episodes "Fun Girls" in Season Three and "The Arrest of the Fun Girls" in Season Four, Helen, along with Thelma Lou, both make assumptions and become unnecessarily jealous and break their dates with Andy and Barney when the "Fun Girls", Daphne and Skippy, both lavish unwelcome romantic attention on Andy and Barney, who both make clear that they have eyes only for their respective girlfriends Helen and Thelma Lou.

In the first episode of The Andy Griffith Show spinoff, Mayberry R.F.D., Andy and Helen marry. Other characters from The Andy Griffith Show make guest appearances in the episode. The episode gave CBS the highest ratings for a new TV series debut for the decade.

The couple move to Raleigh, North Carolina, but return to Mayberry at a later date on Mayberry R.F.D. to christen their newborn son, Andrew Samuel Taylor.

In 1986, Andy and Helen appear in the reunion telemovie Return to Mayberry. The couple returns to Mayberry to see Opie and his wife become first-time parents. In an error of omission, Andrew Jr. who would have been a teenager by then, was not portrayed at all.

Development 
 Helen Crump was intended to be a The Andy Griffith Show one-shot, but producers liked Corsaut's performance and her chemistry with Griffith. Helen then became a recurring character on the show, making a total of 66 appearances.

Appearances 
The following is a list of episodes of The Andy Griffith Show and Mayberry R.F.D. featuring Helen.

The Andy Griffith Show 
Season Three
Episode 23: "Andy Discovers America"
Episode 29: "A Wife for Andy"
Season Four
Episode 8: "Opie's Ill-Gotten Gain"
Episode 9: "A Date for Gomer"
Episode 13: "Barney and the Cave Rescue"
Episode 27: "Fun Girls"
Episode 29: "The Rumor"
Season Five
Episode 1: "Opie Loves Helen"
Episode 4: "The Education of Ernest T. Bass"
Episode 7: "Man in the Middle"
Episode 13: "Andy and Helen Have Their Day"
Episode 14: "Three Wishes for Opie"
Episode 20: "Goober and the Art of Love
Episode 21: "Barney Runs for Sheriff"
Episode 24: "Guest in the House"
Episode 27: "Aunt Bee's Invisible Beau"
Episode 28: "The Arrest of the Fun Girls"
Episode 30: "Opie Flunks Arithmetic"
Episode 31: "Opie and the Carnival"
Season Six
Episode 2: "Andy's Rival"
Episode 4: "Aunt Bee, the Swinger"
Episode 6: "A Warning from Warren"
Episode 7: "Off to Hollywood"
Episode 9: "The Hollywood Party"
Episode 10: "Aunt Bee on TV"
Episode 14: "The Church Organ"
Episode 15: "Girl Shy"
Episode 17: "The Return of Barney Fife"
Episode 21: "Aunt Bee Learns to Drive"
Episode 22: "Look Paw, I'm Dancing"
Episode 23: "The Gypsies"
Episode 24: "Eat Your Heart Out"
Episode 25: "A Baby in the House"
Episode 26: "The County Clerk"
Episode 29: "The Battle of Mayberry"
Season Seven
Episode 1: "Opie's Girlfriend"
Episode 4: "The Ball Game"
Episode 5: "Aunt Bee's Crowning Glory"
Episode 6: "The Darling Fortune"
Episode 9: "The Senior Play"
Episode 10: "Opie Finds a Baby"
Episode 14: "Goober Makes History"
Episode 15: "A New Doctor in Town"
Episode 16: "Don't Miss a Good Bet"
Episode 17: "Dinner at Eight"
Episode 19: "Barney Comes to Mayberry"
Episode 20: "Andy's Old Girlfriend"
Episode 21: "Aunt Bee's Restaurant"
Episode 24: "Helen, the Authoress"
Episode 29: "Opie's Most Unforgettable Character"
Season Eight
Episode 1: "Opie's First Love"
Episode 3: "A Trip to Mexico"
Episode 4: "Andy's Trip to Raleigh"
Episode 6: "Howard's Main Event"
Episode 10: "Aunt Bee and the Lecturer"
Episode 11: "Andy's Investment"
Episode 12: "Howard and Millie"
Episode 13: "Aunt Bee's Cousin"
Episode 18: "Emmett's Brother-in-Law"
Episode 20: "The Church Benefactors"
Episode 23: "Aunt Bee's Big Moment"
Episode 24: "Helen's Past"
Episode 26: "The Wedding"
Episode 27: "Sam for Town Council"
Episode 29: "A Girl for Goober"
Episode 30: "Mayberry R.F.D."

Mayberry R.F.D.
Season One
Episode 1: "Andy and Helen Get Married"
Season Two
Episode 2: "Andy's Baby"

References 

Fictional characters from North Carolina
Fictional schoolteachers
The Andy Griffith Show characters
Television characters introduced in 1963